Johann's Face Records (a.k.a. JFR) is a Chicago-based record label which was started by Marc Ruvolo and Gar Brandt in 1989. Ruvolo had been working at Roadkill Records and was looking to start a label with his friend, Brandt.

The label has released material from a number of bands such as: Alkaline Trio, Apocalypse Hoboken, The Atari Star, The Braves, Cletus, Das Kapital, Deminer, Evil Beaver, Far Rad, First Class, First Class Skatepunk, Gods Reflex, J Church (band), J+J+J, Jerkwater, Lynnards Innards, Midwest Blue, No Empathy, Not Rebecca, Oblivion, Pardon Us, The Prescriptions, The Rutabega, Scared of Chaka, Sludgeworth, Sidekick Kato, Sig Transit Gloria, Smoking Popes, The Strike, The Traitors, Urbs In Horto, Written In Sand, Zoinks! and others.

See also
 List of record labels

External links
 Official Website
 

American record labels
Alternative rock record labels
Record labels established in 1989
Companies based in Chicago